Mark Mercuri (born 21 February 1974) is a former professional Australian rules football player who played for the Essendon Football Club in the Australian Football League. He played in the 1993 premiership winning team which defeated Carlton and in the 2000 premiership team which defeated Melbourne. In the 1999 AFL season, Mercuri was one of the premier players of the competition, finishing runner-up in the Brownlow Medal, and earning a lucrative and rarely heard-of 5-year contract.

Mercuri played his 200th AFL game in round three, 2004 against  in the match best known for James Hird's match-winning goal which broke a 131–all deadlock with less than a minute remaining. He retired following Essendon's 10-point semi-final defeat to Geelong at the Melbourne Cricket Ground.

In 2005, there was talk of a comeback, with Mercuri contemplating nominating for the pre-season draft. This never eventuated.

In 2006 he played for Airport West in the Essendon District Football League.

Playing statistics

|- style="background-color: #EAEAEA"
! scope="row" style="text-align:center" | 1992
|style="text-align:center;"|
| 45 || 3 || 1 || 4 || 22 || 14 || 36 || 9 || 2 || 0.3 || 1.3 || 7.3 || 4.7 || 12.0 || 3.0 || 0.7
|-
|style="text-align:center;background:#afe6ba;"|1993†
|style="text-align:center;"|
| 2 || 20 || 25 || 10 || 251 || 197 || 448 || 106 || 44 || 1.3 || 0.5 || 12.6 || 9.9 || 22.4 || 5.3 || 2.2
|- style="background:#eaeaea;"
! scope="row" style="text-align:center" | 1994
|style="text-align:center;"|
| 2 || 13 || 16 || 7 || 143 || 107 || 250 || 61 || 21 || 1.2 || 0.5 || 11.0 || 8.2 || 19.2 || 4.7 || 1.6
|-
! scope="row" style="text-align:center" | 1995
|style="text-align:center;"|
| 2 || 22 || 36 || 25 || 268 || 217 || 485 || 125 || 32 || 1.6 || 1.1 || 12.2 || 9.9 || 22.0 || 5.7 || 1.5
|- style="background:#eaeaea;"
! scope="row" style="text-align:center" | 1996
|style="text-align:center;"|
| 2 || 21 || 37 || 25 || 244 || 200 || 444 || 115 || 32 || 1.8 || 1.2 || 11.6 || 9.5 || 21.1 || 5.5 || 1.5
|-
! scope="row" style="text-align:center" | 1997
|style="text-align:center;"|
| 2 || 11 || 12 || 10 || 136 || 66 || 202 || 47 || 15 || 1.1 || 0.9 || 12.4 || 6.0 || 18.4 || 4.3 || 1.4
|- style="background:#eaeaea;"
! scope="row" style="text-align:center" | 1998
|style="text-align:center;"|
| 2 || 20 || 24 || 14 || 224 || 141 || 365 || 112 || 27 || 1.2 || 0.7 || 11.2 || 7.1 || 18.3 || 5.6 || 1.4
|-
! scope="row" style="text-align:center" | 1999
|style="text-align:center;"|
| 2 || 21 || 32 || 19 || 256 || 200 || 456 || 103 || 31 || 1.5 || 0.9 || 12.2 || 9.5 || 21.7 || 4.9 || 1.5
|- style="background:#eaeaea;"
|style="text-align:center;background:#afe6ba;"|2000†
|style="text-align:center;"|
| 2 || 20 || 32 || 19 || 208 || 152 || 360 || 92 || 33 || 1.6 || 1.0 || 10.4 || 7.6 || 18.0 || 4.6 || 1.7
|-
! scope="row" style="text-align:center" | 2001
|style="text-align:center;"|
| 2 || 20 || 10 || 10 || 164 || 153 || 317 || 70 || 34 || 0.5 || 0.5 || 8.2 || 7.7 || 15.9 || 3.5 || 1.7
|- style="background:#eaeaea;"
! scope="row" style="text-align:center" | 2002
|style="text-align:center;"|
| 2 || 11 || 7 || 9 || 101 || 93 || 194 || 50 || 21 || 0.6 || 0.8 || 9.2 || 8.5 || 17.6 || 4.5 || 1.9
|-
! scope="row" style="text-align:center" | 2003
|style="text-align:center;"|
| 2 || 16 || 7 || 6 || 126 || 99 || 225 || 74 || 32 || 0.4 || 0.4 || 7.9 || 6.2 || 14.1 || 4.6 || 2.0
|- style="background:#eaeaea;"
! scope="row" style="text-align:center" | 2004
|style="text-align:center;"|
| 2 || 9 || 3 || 0 || 49 || 39 || 88 || 26 || 21 || 0.3 || 0.0 || 6.5 || 4.3 || 9.8 || 2.9 || 2.3
|- class="sortbottom"
! colspan=3| Career
! 207
! 242
! 158
! 2192
! 1678
! 3870
! 990
! 345
! 1.2
! 0.8
! 10.6
! 8.1
! 18.7
! 4.8
! 1.7
|}

References

External links

Essendon Football Club players
Essendon Football Club Premiership players
1974 births
Living people
All-Australians (AFL)
Crichton Medal winners
Australian rules footballers from Victoria (Australia)
Victorian State of Origin players
Two-time VFL/AFL Premiership players